Penny Point is an ice-covered point on the south side of Nicholson Peninsula, marking the north side of the entrance to Matterson Inlet along the Ross Ice Shelf. Named by Advisory Committee on Antarctic Names (US-ACAN) for Lieutenant Commander H.C. Penny, U.S. Navy, commanding officer of USS Vance, ocean station ship in support of aircraft flights between New Zealand and Antarctica in U.S. Navy Operation Deepfreeze 1962.

Headlands of the Ross Dependency
Shackleton Coast